The United States men's national tennis team represents the United States in Davis Cup tennis competition, and is governed by the United States Tennis Association.

The U.S. competed in the first Davis Cup in 1900, when a group of Harvard University students challenged the British. They are the most successful Davis Cup team ever to compete in the Davis Cup, winning the coveted Davis Cup title on 32 separate occasions closely followed by Australia on 28.

History
The U.S. Davis Cup Team won the very first Davis Cup title in 1900.  Their most recent win was in 2007, defeating Russia in the final.

The United States played in the World Group in all but one year (1988) since it was created in 1981, sharing this record with the Czech Republic, and holds the record for ongoing consecutive years in the World Group at 30 as of 2018.

Current squad

Win–loss records are as of 29 November, rankings are as of 22 November 2021.

Recent performances
Here is the list of all match-ups since 1981, when the competition started being held in the current World Group format.

1980s

1990s

2000s

2010s

2020s

Captains

Prior to 1958 most U.S. Davis Cup captains were player-captains.

Statistics

Player records

Team records
The statistics reflect results since the 1900 Davis Cup, and are up-to-date as of the 2022 Davis Cup Finals Group stage.

Key to eras and positions result 
 Challenge Round era (1900–1971): The previous Davis Cup Champion would have a bye to and host the Challenge Round Final. Thus the losing team in the Final (or Inter-zonal final) was the third-placed team. For the purposes of this table, the third placed team is grouped as semifinalists and the Zonal finalists (fourth and fifth placed teams) are grouped as quarterfinalists.
 1972–1980: The previous Davis Cup Champion now had to compete in all rounds. There were four zones consisting of America, Eastern, Europe A and Europe B, with the competition culminating in a four team knockout between zonal winners. The zonal finalists were the equivalent of Davis Cup quarterfinalists.
 Since 1981: World Group (1981–2018), Davis Cup Finals (from 2019) consisting of 16 or 18 teams.
 Abbreviations: POW = Winner of World Group Playoff (1981–2018); POL = Lost in World Group Playoff (1981–2018); GS = Did not advance past the Group Stage of the Davis Cup Finals (from 2019)

Results table 

Home and away records (since 1981)
Performance at home (53 match-ups): 45–8 (84.9%)
Performance away (58 match-ups): 33–25 (56.9%)
Performance neutral (6 match-ups): 2–4 (33.3%)
Total: 80–37 (68.4%)
Only 8 home losses: Germany: 2–3 (1987, PO), Italy: 1–4 (1998, SF), Australia: 1–4 (1999, QF), Croatia: 2–3 (2005, 1R) + 2–3 (2016, QF), Spain: 1–3 (2011, QF), Serbia: 1–3 (2013, QF), Great Britain: 1–3 (2014, 1R)
Has a losing record against only 4 nations: Croatia (0–5), Germany/West Germany (1–3), Serbia (1–2), Spain (3–5)
Has never played against 8 countries which, at one point or another, played in the World Group: Denmark, Indonesia, Israel, New Zealand, South Africa, South Korea, Soviet Union, SFR Yugoslavia.

Head-to-head records
The statistics reflect results since the 1981 Davis Cup, and are up-to-date as of the 2023 Davis Cup qualifying round.

Record against countries

* includes  (3–0)
** includes  (0–3)

Record against continents

Records by decade
2020–2029: 5–4 (55.6%)
2010–2019: 12–10 (54.5%)
2000–2009: 19–9 (67.9%)
1990–1999: 25–7 (78.1%)
1981–1989: 19–7 (73.1%)
Total: 80–37 (68.4%)

Junior Davis Cup
 Winners in 1999 (3–0 vs Croatia), 2008 (2–0 vs Argentina), 2014 (3–0 vs South Korea).
 Runners-up in 1985, 1986, 1988, 2002, 2017, 2019.

Notes

References

External links

Davis Cup teams
Davis Cup